My So-Called Life is an American teen drama television series created by Winnie Holzman and produced by Edward Zwick and Marshall Herskovitz. It originally aired on ABC from August 25, 1994, to January 26, 1995. It is distributed by The Bedford Falls Company with ABC Productions.
Set at the fictional Liberty High School in a fictional suburb near Pittsburgh, Pennsylvania called Three Rivers, it follows the emotional travails of several teenagers in the social circle of main character Angela Chase, played by Claire Danes.

The show was officially canceled on May 15, 1995, despite being critically praised for its realistic portrayal of adolescence and the commentary of its central character Angela, and the series' reception of several major awards, which included a Golden Globe Award for Danes. Besides Danes, the show also launched the careers of several other major actors of her generation, including Jared Leto and Wilson Cruz. The show became a cult classic and has been frequently cited by multiple publications including Time, Entertainment Weekly, TV Guide, The Atlantic, and Rolling Stone as one of the best teen dramas of all time.

Premise 
Angela Chase (Claire Danes) is a 15-year-old high school student who lives in the fictional Pittsburgh suburb of Three Rivers with her mother Patty (Bess Armstrong), father Graham (Tom Irwin), and little sister Danielle (Lisa Wilhoit). Each episode, which is usually narrated by Angela, follows her trials and tribulations as she deals with friends, parents, guys, and school.

Themes
My So-Called Life dealt with major social issues of the mid-1990s, including child abuse, homophobia, teenage alcoholism, homelessness, adultery, school violence, censorship, and drug use. Many shows at the time used these themes as a one-time issue (a "very special episode") that was introduced as a problem at the beginning of an episode and resolved at the end, but on My So-Called Life these issues were part of the continuing storyline. The title of the show alludes to the perception of meaninglessness that many teenagers experience and encapsulates the main theme of the series. The show depicts the teenage years as being difficult and confusing rather than a light, fun-filled time.

Characters

Claire Danes as Angela Chase
Bess Armstrong as Patricia "Patty" Chase
A. J. Langer as Rayanne Graff
Wilson Cruz as Enrique "Rickie" Vasquez
Devon Gummersall as Brian 
Jared Leto as Jordan Catalano
Devon Odessa as Sharon Cherski
Lisa Wilhoit as Danielle Chase
Tom Irwin as Graham Chase

Production

Development 
Marshall Herskovitz was approached by Showtime in the 1980s to write a show about teenagers. Herskovitz conceived of the series as a “very personal, very internal” story about a boy with the title Secret/Seventeen, but it was not picked up by the network. A few years later, after the cancellation of Thirtysomething in 1991, Herskovitz and his co-creator Edward Zwick approached Winnie Holzman, a writer on Thirtysomething and The Wonder Years, to brainstorm a new show. Holzman sparked to the idea of an "uncensored" depiction of teenage life. Said Herskovitz, “Most shows about teens on television [in the early ’90s, like Beverly Hills, 90210] were very exploitative about sexuality and meant to be titillating rather than inside the experience of what it meant to be an adolescent.”   

To capture contemporary adolescence authentically, Holzman did research and taught classes at Fairfax High School in Los Angeles for a few days. She also kept a diary and wrote down journal entries from the perspective of a teenage girl. These journal entries would later become the basis for Angela's voice-overs.

Holzman named the title character Angela after the niece of a script coordinator on Thirtysomething. Holzman recounted, “She mentioned to me she had a young teenage niece named Angela. I had a phone conversation with [Angela] and it really affected me. I remember she said something like, ‘Boys just have it so easy.’ And that's in the pilot. So I named the character Angela partly in honor of her.”

Intent on dismantling stereotypical portrayals of teens and parents on TV, Holzman wrote Patty Chase, the wife and mother character, as the breadwinner of the Chase family and husband Graham as the homebody. Holzman portrayed the parents as in the “midst of establishing their identities and discovering their incompatibility with traditional domestic tropes.”

Casting 
In keeping with their desire to portray adolescence authentically, producers looked for actors who were close in age to their teen characters.  Before Claire Danes was cast, Alicia Silverstone auditioned for the role of Angela and impressed Zwick, and as an emancipated minor could work longer hours, but was not deemed the right fit for "Holzman’s messy high-school universe, which included subplots about drug addiction, bullying, binge drinking, promiscuity, and homosexuality". Herskovitz thought that Silverstone was too beautiful to play a conflicted teenager uncertain of herself. He said "We needed somebody who shimmered between beauty and sort of not formed yet. And in walks Claire. She read the scene in the pilot where she has a confrontation with her childhood best friend. There was a direction that said, 'Angela starts to tear up.' Claire gets to the moment. Her whole face turns red. She's having this intense emotional experience — and then pulls it back. Everybody was just knocked out." As Danes was 15 and had to attend school alongside filming, producers ended up increasing the screen time for the parental characters to accommodate for Danes.

Wilson Cruz was cast as Rickie Vasquez, who was originally written in the script as ''half black, half Puerto Rican, sexually ambiguous like Jodie Foster in Alice Doesn't Live Here Anymore.'' The character of Rickie was inspired by Holzman's peers as a teenager, as well as by the 1990 documentary Paris Is Burning, which explores ball culture in New York City. Cruz drew on some of his own experiences, such as a period of homelessness after he came out to his dad, for his portrayal of Rickie.

Jared Leto was originally supposed to appear in just the pilot episode, but his acting and chemistry with Danes impressed producers and he was upgraded to the main cast.

Filming 
The pilot was shot in April 1993. An enthusiastic response from ABC executives and TV critics raised producers' hopes for a series debut in the 1993-1994 TV season lineup; however, ABC delayed My So-Called Life’s addition as they pondered over the right time slot for the show. The show finally premiered in the Thursday night lineup in August 1994, a year and a half after the filming of the pilot.

The series was filmed in the Los Angeles area. Scenes at the fictional Liberty High School were shot on location at University High School.

Due to the show's rapid shooting schedule and the uncertainty of its future, producers "did not have the luxury of planning out the season's arc in advance," and story lines would unfold episode to episode. Network executives did give the show's creators relatively free rein to explore  what were then seen as risky subjects for network TV, such as teen sexuality and orientation.

Reception

Critical reception
Upon its debut, My So-Called Life received widespread critical acclaim. Critic Joyce Millman said the show "evokes the emotional turbulence of adolescence with breathtaking accuracy” and is also “unusually perceptive in its portrayal of the push and pull of mother-daughter relationships." Millman added the show has an interesting take on “midlife crisis and marital boredom”, and concluded “with bittersweet clarity, My So-Called Life shows us that teen angst is something we never outgrow.”

The Hartford Courant called it "one of the most humanizing hours of television to come along in decades." Steven Spielberg lauded the show and called Danes “one of the most exciting actresses to debut in 10 years”, likening her to Audrey Hepburn.

In a critical review, Howard Rosenberg of the Los Angeles Times found the teen characters grating and the plot lines to be too neatly resolved, but did praise Holzman's writing and Danes’ acting. Rosenberg wrote, “you also recognize that Holzman has a witty grasp on adolescence and knows a bull’s-eye when she sees one...Another plus is the brooding self-consciousness that seems so genuine in Angela, a credit to Danes’ effortless performance. Her nervous body language speaks volumes, as do her character's private thoughts, delivered as part of a voice-over narration in the manner of ‘The Wonder Years.’”

After the series' cancellation and over the years, the series continued to gain acclaim for its realism and is praised by some critics as one of the greatest television series of all time. On review aggregation website Rotten Tomatoes, Season 1 has a 95% approval rating based on 20 reviews. The site's consensus reads, "Effectively avoiding cliche and cheesy exposition, My So-Called Lifes realistic portrayal of the average American girl is ahead of its time". On Metacritic, which assigns a weighted average rating, the show has a score of 92 out of 100 based on 19 reviews, indicating "universal acclaim". It is the 70th highest rated television series on the website. In 2007, it was listed as one of Time's "100 Best TV Shows of All-TIME". Time critic James Poniewozik wrote,

In 2008, AOL TV named My So-Called Life as the second Best School Show of All Time. It was number 33 on Entertainment Weeklys "New Classics TV" list of shows from 1983 to 2008, and as number 8 in the "25 Greatest Cult TV Shows Ever". TV Guide ranked the series number 16 on its 25 Top Cult Shows Ever list in 2004, as well as number 2 on its 2013 list of 60 shows that were "Cancelled Too Soon".

Awards and nominations

Ratings
For its original run in the United States, the show aired on Thursday nights at 8 p.m. ET against top-10 hit sitcoms — Mad About You and Friends on NBC, as well as the popular Martin and Living Single on Fox, possibly contributing to the series' low ratings.

The producers said that they could not fault ABC for the creative freedom and support they gave them during production, as there were probably few networks that would have even put My So-Called Life on the air in the first place.

My So-Called Life was produced before the explosion of youth and teen programming. The culture of television changed significantly in the years that immediately followed, most notably with the rise of The WB and UPN—networks that catered to the teenaged audience My So-Called Life sought—during the late 1990s and early 2000s (The WB and UPN launched just two weeks and one week, respectively, before My So-Called Lifes run on ABC ended). “Networks didn’t understand that you could sell to adolescent girls,” said Herskovitz. Although My So-Called Life drew adult fans in addition to teenage viewers, the ratings-focused ABC concluded not enough viewers of a particular demographic were watching the show during its initial network run. Holzman said, "It is one thing to have huge ratings, but it is quite another to have smaller ratings but with an extremely passionate following. I don't understand why the network did not understand that."

When the network was considering canceling the show, producers Zwick and Herskovitz appealed to then-ABC President Bob Iger, telling him, "'You should keep this show on the air because teenage girls have no voice in our culture, and the show is giving them a voice.'" In January 1995, it was reported the show averaged 10 million viewers per week, a number ABC president of entertainment Ted Harbert said was high, but still fell short compared to ABC sitcom Home Improvement, which averaged 30 million viewers weekly.

Cancelation
An online fan campaign attempted to save My So-Called Life, the first such event in the history of the World Wide Web. Bolstered by fans' support, Ted Harbert said he was prepared to bring the show back for a second season. However, Herskovitz said at that time Danes and her parents approached the show's creators and told producers that she did not want to be involved with the show if it continued, citing the arduous shooting schedule which required the show's young actors to balance schoolwork with rehearsal and time on the set.

When Holzman learned Danes was no longer keen to continue with the show, her attitude changed as well. Holzman said, "When I realized that Claire truly did not want to do it any more, it was hard for me to want to do it. The joy in writing the show was that everyone was behind it and wanted to do it. And I love her. So part of the joy and excitement and happiness would have gone out of me if she had not been on board 100 percent. I wasn't able to say this at the time, but in retrospect it was a blessing for it to end at a time when we all enjoyed doing it. That's not to say that if the network had ordered more shows that I wouldn't have given it my best. But there was a rightness in how short the season was. This was a show about adolescence and sort of ended in its own adolescence. There was an aura about how short the series was like all things that die young. The show ended at a point that it was still all potential."

The show was officially canceled on May 15, 1995, for its "far too narrow" appeal. Although the fan campaign was not successful in getting a second season, the surrounding publicity led to MTV airing repeats of the show a month prior, which helped the show gain newer exposure. In a 2004 interview with Entertainment Weekly, Danes insisted that she didn't have enough power to cause the cancelation by herself. It is generally accepted that the show's cancelation was the result of a variety of factors, including low ratings and scant publicity from the network. Bess Armstrong said, "Actually, I don't think there were any bad guys. It was just a confluence of events. It was a perfect storm." Winnie Holzman theorized that the network was so on-the-fence about renewing the show in the first place that in some ways they used Danes' reluctance to return as a convenient excuse to not renew the series.

Episodes

Planned storylines 
Had the show continued, Winnie Holzman said a second season would potentially have seen Patty and Graham getting a divorce, Angela turning to Brian for comfort, Sharon dealing with a teen pregnancy, and Brian and Delia getting together at some point.

Cultural impact 
My So-Called Life is seen as a groundbreaking television show for its realistic portrayal of adolescence and for launching a revolution of teen angst-oriented dramas on primetime TV. It is credited with moving teen dramas away from the soap opera tone of previous shows like Beverly Hills, 90210 and towards a smarter look at everyday teenage life.

On a 2012 list of cult TV shows, critic Melissa Maerz wrote "it was the first teen drama that didn't feel like an after-school special. No one ever learned a very important lesson or uttered the phrase 'I love you, Dad.' Angela acted like a real 15-year-old, with all the crying jags and Buffalo Tom concerts that implies. What's even more impressive is that anyone who watched the show back in the '90s, when angst and Manic Panic felt totally of the moment, can now enjoy it on a very different level. Suddenly, Angela's parents are relatable. Dammit, we're old."

Of the character types explored in the show, Jeff Jensen of Entertainment Weekly wrote, “[Winnie] Holzman took these stock types and made them complicated and real — you didn't need to be a girl to feel Angela's longing for Jordan, didn't need to be gay to connect with Rickie's coming-out journey.” The character of Rickie Vasquez became the first openly queer character on primetime TV, and the first queer character of color. The final episode of the series, "In Dreams Begin Responsibilities" is notable for featuring a moment in which Ricky says out loud that he's gay — "a first for both the character and network television." While doing publicity for the show at the time, Cruz made a point of communicating that he was gay in real life.

In a 2017 article for The Guardian, Soraya Roberts wrote My So-Called Life "not only flirted with gender fluidity before it became a part of the national conversation, it questioned the parameters of conventional maleness,” and "was the rare primetime show that candidly discussed teen sex (according to the Kaiser Family Foundation, by 1996 only 12% of shows involved adolescent sexual content) – not only that, teen girl sex." The episode "Guns and Gossip" is notable for addressing the topic of gun violence in schools, five years before Columbine.

Numerous showrunners and creators of teen-centered dramas or sitcoms, including Nahnatchka Khan (Fresh Off the Boat), Brian Yorkey (13 Reasons Why), Stephanie Savage (Gossip Girl), and Terri Minski (Andi Mack), have cited MSCL and its impact on them as teens. Showrunner and Arrowverse creator Greg Berlanti called the series "the most painfully honest portrayal of adolescence ever on television.”

The series is ranked at number 68 on the Writers Guild of America 2013 list of the 101 Best-Written TV Series,  and is frequently included in lists of TV shows that were cancelled too soon.

My So-Called Life also inspired a German version of the sitcom called Mein Leben & Ich, which ran for 6 seasons and a total of 74 episodes, 25 minutes each.

Home media
A subset of the episodes were released on VHS by BMG Video in 1998.

On November 19, 2002, Sony BMG released the complete series on a five-disc box set.

On May 14, 2007, Universal Playback released the complete series in the United Kingdom in Region 2.

On October 30, 2007, Shout! Factory re-released My So-Called Life on DVD in Region 1 in a six-disc box set with a disc of special features, including an interview with series star Claire Danes. Shout! Factory is a distribution company that has released short-lived shows in the past.

On September 13, 2007, Eurovideo released the complete series on DVD in Germany in Region 2; The 5-disc boxset featured German and English soundtrack but no special features.

On June 10, 2008, Beyond Home Entertainment released the complete series on DVD in Australia in Region 4.

On December 3, 2008, Free Dolphin released the complete series on DVD in France in Region 2, with a 32-page booklet but no other special features.

As of March 2021, Hulu is the official streaming service for the series.

Soundtrack
Atlantic Records released a soundtrack of the show, which was originally released on August 25, 1994, then re-released on January 24, 1995.

Sequel novel
A sequel novel by Catherine Clark, My So-Called Life Goes On, was published in 1999 by Random House.

References

External links

 
 

1990s American high school television series
1990s American LGBT-related drama television series
1990s American teen drama television series
1994 American television series debuts
1995 American television series endings
American Broadcasting Company original programming
English-language television shows
Television series about teenagers
Coming-of-age television shows
Television series by Disney–ABC Domestic Television
Television shows set in Pittsburgh